Racing Youth is a 1932 American pre-Code drama film directed by Vin Moore and written by Earle Snell. The film stars Slim Summerville, Louise Fazenda, Frank Albertson, June Clyde, Arthur Stuart Hull and Forrest Stanley. The film was released on April 1, 1932, by Universal Pictures.

Cast 
Slim Summerville as Slim
Louise Fazenda as Daisy Joy
Frank Albertson as Teddy Blue
June Clyde as Amelia Cruickshank
Arthur Stuart Hull as Brown
Forrest Stanley as Sanford
Eddie Phillips as Van
Otis Harlan as Dave

References

External links 
 

1932 films
1930s English-language films
American auto racing films
1932 romantic drama films
American romantic drama films
1932 drama films
Universal Pictures films
Films directed by Vin Moore
American black-and-white films
1930s American films